Burton Francis (born 2 January 1987) is a South African professional rugby union footballer. He usually plays as a fly-half although he has occasionally operated as a full-back.

Career

Youth
At youth level, he represented  at the 2004 Under-18 Academy Week. He also represented the Leopards in the Under-19 Provincial Championship tournament.

Blue Bulls / Bulls
He made several appearances for them in the Vodacom Cup and Currie Cup competitions in 2008 and 2009.

Golden Lions / Lions

Western Province / Stormers

SWD Eagles

Griquas / Cheetahs
His journey of South African teams continued when he joined  for the 2013 Vodacom Cup season. Following an injury to Elgar Watts, he was included in the ' Super Rugby squad. and never actually made a competitive appearance for Griquas.

Agen
In 2013, he joined French Pro D2 side Agen.

External links

Stormers profile
itsrugby.co.uk profile

References

Living people
1987 births
South African rugby union players
Stormers players
Western Province (rugby union) players
Rugby union fly-halves
Bulls (rugby union) players
Blue Bulls players
Golden Lions players
Lions (United Rugby Championship) players
Sportspeople from Paarl
Eastern Province Elephants players
Cheetahs (rugby union) players
SWD Eagles players
Rugby union players from the Western Cape